A constitutional dictatorship is a form of government in which dictatorial powers are exercised during an emergency. The dictator is not absolute and the dictator's authority remains limited by the constitution.

The Roman Republic made provision for a dictator who could govern unchecked for a stipulated period of time. Unlike other magistrates, a dictator was not subject to review of his actions at the conclusion of his term.

Abraham Lincoln, President of the United States during the American Civil War, exercised extraordinary powers to preserve the Union. Lincoln's dictatorial actions included directly ordering the arrest and detention of Confederate sympathizers and the suspension of the right to writs of habeas corpus. However, Lincoln remained subject to Congressional oversight, judicial review, and periodic elections.

The Weimar Republic, which succeeded Imperial Germany after the First World War, adopted a constitutional provision that expressly enabled the president to rule by decree, without consultation with the legislative branch. That provision was used by Chancellor Hitler to consolidate his powers upon his selection by President Hindenburg.

US President Franklin D. Roosevelt also exercised extraordinary powers in response to the Great Depression and the Second World War. Roosevelt's actions included violating the US Constitution's Contract Clause, the closing of banks, and a moratorium on foreclosures. Later, meeting a perceived threat by Japanese nationals and Japanese-Americans, Roosevelt ordered their relocation to internment camps.

In the 21st century, John Yoo, attorney and legal theorist, has offered a theory of the unitary executive for massive authority of the US President, in his capacity as commander-in-chief of the armed forces. Yoo provided the intellectual foundation for many of the actions undertaken by the George W. Bush administration in the aftermath of the attacks of September 11, 2001.

See also
 Roman dictator
 Unitary executive theory

References

General
 Rossiter, Clinton, Constitutional Dictatorship: Crisis Government in Modern Democracies (Princeton University Press 1948; Reprinted by Rossiter Press 2007)
 Yoo, John, The Powers of War and Peace: The Constitution and Foreign Affairs After 9/11 (University of Chicago Press 2005)

Authoritarianism
Constitutional law
Dictatorship
Emergency laws